Phellodon tomentosus, commonly known as the zoned cork hydnum, is a species of tooth fungus in the family Bankeraceae. First described as Hydnum tomentosum by Carl Linnaeus in 1753, it was transferred to the genus Phellodon by Howard James Banker in 1906. It is found in Asia, Europe, and North America.

The brown mushroom's cap is 1.5–5 cm wide, broad, flat, or funnel-shaped, sometimes fused with others, zoned with a white margin, dry, thin, and fragrant-smelling; the taste is mild to bitter. The spines on the undersurface are 1–3 mm long, grayish-brown with pale tips, some running down the upper portion of the stalk. The flesh is brown. The stalk is 1–5 cm tall and 2–5 mm wide. The spores are white and more or less globose and spiny.

The mushroom is inedible.

Similar species include Phellodon atratus, Coltricia cinnamomea, Sarcodon fuscoindicus.

References

Fungi described in 1753
Fungi of Asia
Fungi of Europe
Fungi of North America
Inedible fungi
tomentosus
Taxa named by Carl Linnaeus